Raid on Bungeling Bay is a shoot 'em up video game developed by Will Wright and published by Broderbund for the Commodore 64 in 1984. It was the first video game designed by Will Wright. The Commodore 64 version was published in the UK by Ariolasoft. The game inspired Wright to develop SimCity in 1989.

Gameplay

Raid on Bungeling Bay is a 2D shoot 'em up. The player controls a helicopter launched from an aircraft carrier to bomb six factories scattered across islands on a small planetoid occupied by the Bungeling Empire (frequent villains in Broderbund games), while fending off escalating counterattacks by gun turrets, fighter jets, guided missiles, and a battleship. There is also a hidden island for the player to reload on. Failure means that the Bungeling Empire develops a war machine to take over the planet Earth. Players have to attack its infrastructure while defending the aircraft carrier which serves as home base.

The game offers an insight into the design style of Wright, who also designed SimCity. Over time, the factories grow and develop new technologies to use against the player. There are also visible signs of interdependency among the islands, such as supply boats moving between them. In order to win the game, the player must prevent the escalation by bombing all the factories as quickly as possible, keeping them from advancing their technology. If left alone for too long, the factories create enough new weaponry to overwhelm the player.

Ports
Raid on Bungeling Bay was ported to the Famicom/NES by Hudson Soft. Hudson published this version and released it in Japan on February 15, 1985. A conversion for the arcade-based VS. System was created based on this port, and it was distributed to arcades by Nintendo. An MSX version was developed by Zap and published by Sony. The Japanese releases of the game are alternatively titled . Will Wright stated in an interview that he was not sure if the arcade version was actually released in the United States.

Reception
Raid on Bungeling Bay for the Commodore 64 sold about 20,000 to 30,000 units in America, while the NES version sold about a million units in Japan. The large discrepancy was attributed to lack of software piracy on the NES due to its cartridge system along with Raid being one of the first American games published in Japan.  Sales of the game gave Will Wright the financial freedom to create SimCity.

Compute! wrote in 1985 that Raid "possesses all the virtues needed to appease the demanding gamer", with "amazingly detailed" graphics. Computer Gaming World in 1988 approved of the Nintendo version's graphics, calling it a "high adventure with realistic overtones" that did not involve dragons or elves. The magazine named it the Action-Strategy Game of the Year for Nintendo, writing that Raid had been "rescued from Broderbund's computer software vaults, updated slightly, and sent out to challenge all the bright new [Nintendo games and] blew them out of the water ... a delightful game experience". In 1996, Computer Gaming World declared Raid on Bungeling Bay the 24th-best computer game ever released.

Legacy
Wright continued to develop the editor for the game as a personal toy because he enjoyed it so much. He researched urban planning and realised that others might enjoy constructing and building cities themselves. The result was a more advanced simulation that eventually became SimCity.

References

External links

Review in GAMES Magazine

1984 video games
Broderbund games
Commodore 64 games
Helicopter video games
Hudson Soft games
MSX games
Multiplayer and single-player video games
Nintendo Entertainment System games
Nintendo games
Nintendo Vs. Series games
Shoot 'em ups
Video games developed in the United States
Video games set on fictional islands
ZAP Corporation games
Ariolasoft games